Dwaraka Nagar is a village in Kadapa district, Andhra Pradesh, India. It falls under the jurisdiction of Gopavaram panchayat and comes under the industrial area.

Villages in Kadapa district